Holroyd High School, (abbreviation HHS) is a school located in Greystanes, New South Wales, on Cumberland Road. It is a co-educational high school operated by the New South Wales Department of Education with students from years 7 to 12. The school was established in 1968.

The school houses an Intensive English Centre which provides a specialised program to non-English speaking migrants and refugees.

Friends of Zainab Trust Fund 
When Zainab Kaabi, a refugee from Iran, who spent two years living in Australia, had her temporary protection visa benefits cut, the school's principal, Dorothy Hoddinott, set up a trust fund to support her financially so that she was able to complete her education. She kickstarted the fund with her own personal finances and over time invited more people to contribute. In 2008, Hoddinott was made an officer of the Order of Australia in recognition of her work with the Friends of Zainab Trust fund.

The trust fund now helps a considerable number of students who are refugees.

Notable alumni 
 Chris Bathpresenter of Seven News in Sydney
 Michael Reganformer mayor of Warringah Council
 Brett Kenny - former professional rugby league footballer

References

External links 
 Holroyd High School website

Public high schools in Sydney
Educational institutions established in 1968
1968 establishments in Australia